Henry Francis Lambert (8 July 1918 – 19 June 1995) was an Australian first-class cricketer who represented Victoria in the Sheffield Shield and the Commonwealth XI from 1946 to 1954. He also played Australian rules football during the 1940s with Collingwood in the Victorian Football League (VFL).

Career

Football 
Lambert was a footballer originally and in just his second game of VFL football kicked a six-goal haul, against Hawthorn at Victoria Park. Recruited from Abbotsford, he bagged another four the following weekend and finished the 1941 season with 19 goals from seven games. After managing only five appearances over the next four years, the forward played 11 games in 1946. He had a good finals campaign, kicking three goals in Collingwood's drawn Semi Final with Essendon and two in the Preliminary Final loss to Melbourne. Lambert ended his career in 1947 with 27 games and 48 goals for Collingwood.

Cricket 
After a couple of first-class fixtures against Tasmania in December 1946, Lambert made his Sheffield Shield debut in the 1947/48 competition. The following season he took 17 wickets at 22.88 with his left-arm fast-medium bowling  which earned him a spot in the Commonwealth XI squad to tour India, Pakistan and Ceylon. He bowled well in India, taking 25 wickets at 32.24, eight of them in four matches against the national team.

Lambert spent the 1949 English summer playing as a Professional with the Ramsbottom Cricket Club in the Lancashire League.

In 1953/54, his last season, Lambert took career best figures of 6 for 55 against New South Wales, including the scalps of Jim Burke and Keith Miller. He also batted well in that match after being promoted to the top order, scoring 29 and 43. His batting had improved over the years and in his final first-class match, against New Zealand at the Melbourne Cricket Ground, Lambert opened the batting and scored 50. The only other half century of his career came was an innings of 59 in 1950, when he was batting in the lower order for the Commonwealth XI against Bombay.

References

External links 
 
 

1918 births
1995 deaths
Australian cricketers
Victoria cricketers
Commonwealth XI cricketers
Australian expatriate cricketers in the United Kingdom
Australian rules footballers from Victoria (Australia)
Collingwood Football Club players
People from Bairnsdale
Cricketers from Victoria (Australia)